Vasiliki Pavlidou is a Greek astrophysicst and Associate Professor in the Department of Physics at the University of Crete. Her research interests focus on cosmology, high energy physics and radio astronomy.

Education 
Pavlidou received her BSc from the Aristotle University of Thessaloniki in 1999. She continued her studies at the University of Illinois at Urbana Champaign, where she completed her doctoral thesis on astrophysics, and received her doctoral title in 2005.

Research 
From 2005 to 2008, Pavlidou held a postdoctoral position at the Institute of Cosmology at the University of Chicago. From 2008 to 2011 she was awarded the Einstein scholarship at Caltech. In 2010 she was elected as an Assistant Professor at the University of Crete but the appointment was delayed due to the financial crisis in Greece. In 2011-2012 she was visiting researcher at the Max-Plank Institute for Radioastronomy. In 2012 she accepted a research position at the University of Crete. In 2013 her appointment as an Assistant Professor at the University of Crete begun and in 2018 she was promoted to Associate Professor.

Pavlidou has been the chair of the management panel of the RoboPol collaboration since 2012.

Science communication 
Pavlidou has promoted science communication by giving talks and presentations to the general public. She has been in the organizing committee of workshops targeting a specialist audience.
Vasiliki Pavlidou together with Konstantinos Tassis have developed an introductory astronomy mooc for the general public at the mathesis platform.

Awards 
 1999 Theoretical Physics Fellowship Greek State Scholarships Foundation
2002 Amelia Earhart Fellowship Zonta Foundation
2008 GLAST (Einstein) Fellowship NASA
2014 Award for Women in Science (Greece) L’Oreal-UNESCO

Selected publications

References 

Greek women physicists
Living people
Academic staff of the University of Crete
Cosmologists
Aristotle University of Thessaloniki alumni
University of Illinois Chicago alumni
Year of birth missing (living people)